"5 Years From Now" is the second single released by Australian group Mercury4 from their self-titled debut album, Mercury4. "5 Years From Now" debuted at #20 on the Australian ARIA Singles Chart and in the following week ascended to its peak at #16, becoming Mercury4's second top twenty hit. "5 Years From Now" although had reached a lower peak than its predecessor "Get Me Some", lasted nine weeks on the chart, a week more than its processor.

The song was produced by The Matrix, which also produced and co-wrote Avril Lavigne's "Sk8er Boi" in 2001. "Sk8er Boi" has the line "five years from now" in it.

Track listing

Charts

References

2004 singles
Song recordings produced by the Matrix (production team)
2004 songs
Songs written by Lauren Christy
Songs written by Scott Spock
Songs written by Graham Edwards (musician)